Charles R. Chaney, known as Bubba Chaney (born September 23, 1946), is a former member of the Louisiana House of Representatives for District 19, which includes his home city of Rayville in Richland Parish in northeastern Louisiana.

A graduate of Louisiana State University in Baton Rouge, Chaney is the owner and manager of Albert's Men's Wear in Rayville. He is married to the former Sharon Crawford.

On February 7, 2011, Chaney made headlines by vaulting from the Democrats to the Republicans. His switch was notable because it gave the GOP its first majority in the Louisiana House of Representatives since Reconstruction. In the nonpartisan blanket primary held on October 22, 2011, Chaney was unopposed for his second term in the House.

Legislative record

Chaney is a former member of the Louisiana House Committee on Education. In 2010, he sponsored legislation to broaden the approval process for textbooks in public schools. This action brought him into opposition from the conservative Louisiana Family Forum, which Chaney said "absolutely ambushed" him. Chaney's score from the Louisiana Family Forum was 56 percent in 2008 and 78 percent in 2009. As of 2015, he was a member of the House committees on (1) Agriculture, (2) Appropriations, (3) Budget, and (4) Natural Resources and Environment.

Chaney ran unopposed in the October 24, 2015, primary election.

Chaney is term-limited in the October 12, 2019, nonpartisan blanket primary for his House seat. Instead his House predecessor, term-limited state Senator Francis C. Thompson, will seek to succeed Chaney in the House, in which Thompson previously served from 1975 to 2008.

Notes

1946 births
Living people
Businesspeople from Louisiana
Louisiana Democrats
Louisiana Republicans
Louisiana State University alumni
Members of the Louisiana House of Representatives
People from Rayville, Louisiana
21st-century American politicians